Değnek is a village in Toroslar district, an intracity district of Greater Mersin, Mersin Province, Turkey. It is situated on the Taurus Mountains. The population of the village was 372 as of 2012. The main crops of the village are fruits like peaches and cherries. In the near future, the dam will be used to irrigate 45,000 decares of land.

References

Villages in Toroslar District